The Bayer designation Tau Arietis (τ Ari, τ Arietis) is shared by two star systems, in the constellation Aries:
 τ1 Arietis
 τ2 Arietis
They are separated by 0.54°.

Aries (constellation)
Arietis, Tau